Kidysh (Qıyźış) is a rural locality (a village) in Akhunovsky Selsoviet, Uchalinsky District, Bashkortostan, Russia. The population was 119 as of 2010. There are 3 streets.

Geography 
Kidysh is located 31 km southeast of Uchaly (the district's administrative centre) by road. Akhunovo is the nearest rural locality.

References 

Rural localities in Uchalinsky District